Conception is a compilation album issued by Prestige Records in 1956 as PRLP 7013, featuring Miles Davis on a number of tracks. The album, compiled from earlier 10 inch LPs, or as 78rpm singles, also features musicians such as Lee Konitz, Sonny Rollins, Stan Getz, Gerry Mulligan, and Zoot Sims. The cover was designed by Bob Parent. In particular, the entirety of the 10"LP Lee Konitz: The New Sounds (PRLP 116) makes up all of side 1.

Track listing
 "Odjenar" (George Russell) - 2:52
 "Hibeck" (Lee Konitz) - 3:07
 "Yesterdays" (Jerome Kern) - 2:27
 "Ezz-Thetic" (Russell) - 2:54
 "Indian Summer" (Victor Herbert) - 2:35
 "Duet for Saxophone and Guitar" (Konitz) - 2:41
 "Conception" (George Shearing) - 4:03
 "My Old Flame" (Sam Coslow, Arthur Johnston) - 6:36
 "Intoit" (Stan Getz) - 3:22
 "Prezervation" (Getz) - 2:44
 "I May Be Wrong" (Gerry Mulligan) - 3:28
 "So What" (Mulligan) - 2:44

Note: The final track, "So What", is not the same composition attributed to Miles Davis for his 1959 album Kind of Blue.

Recording sessions and personnel

June 21, 1949 (NYC)
"Prezervation"
Stan Getz - Tenor sax
Al Haig - Piano
Gene Ramey - Bass
Stan Levey - Drums

originally released on the 78rpm single: 
 Prestige 818: Stan Getz - Battleground / Prezervation

1950

January 6 (NYC)
"Intoit"
Stan Getz - Tenor sax
Al Haig - Piano
Tommy Potter - Bass
Roy Haynes - Drums

originally released on the 78rpm single: 
 Prestige 867: Stan Getz - Intoit / You Stepped Out Of A Dream

March 15 (NYC)
"I May Be Wrong"
Don Ferrara, Howard McGhee, Al Porcino - Trumpets
J.J. Johnson, Kai Winding - Trombones
Charlie Kennedy - Alto sax
Georgie Auld, Zoot Sims - Tenor saxes
Gerry Mulligan - Baritone sax
Tony Aless - Piano
Chubby Jackson - Bass
Don Lamond - Drums

"So What"
Gerry Mulligan - Baritone sax
Zoot Sims - Tenor sax
Charlie Kennedy - Alto sax
J. J. Johnson, Kai Winding - Trombones
Tony Aless - Piano
Chubby Jackson - Bass
Don Lamond - Drums

"I May Be Wrong" and "So What" were originally issued on the 10"LP Chubby Jackson All Star Big Band (PRLP 105), although they are here credited to Gerry Mulligan.

1951

March 8 (NYC)
"Odjenar", "Hibeck", "Yesterdays", "Ezz-Thetic"
Lee Konitz - Alto sax
Miles Davis - Trumpet
Sal Mosca - Piano
Billy Bauer - Guitar
Arnold Fishkin - Bass
Max Roach - Drums

March 13 (NYC)
"Indian Summer", "Duet for Saxophone and Guitar"
Lee Konitz - Alto sax
Billy Bauer - Guitar

All six Lee Konitz tracks were originally issued on the 10"LP Lee Konitz: The New Sounds (PRLP 116), which is reissued in its entirety here. The tracks with Miles Davis as a sideman were recorded after Davis' first Prestige session, and before Davis' own debut album, also called The New Sounds (PRLP 124). Konitz and Davis had previously worked together on the Birth of the Cool sessions.

October 5 (Apex Studios, NYC)
"Conception", "My Old Flame"
Miles Davis - Trumpet
Sonny Rollins - Tenor sax
Walter Bishop - Piano
Tommy Potter - Bass
Art Blakey - Drums

Both Miles Davis tracks were previously released on Miles Davis: the New Sounds (PRLP 124), Davis' first album. The other two tracks from that album were reissued on Dig  (PRLP 7012), and "Conception" and "My Old Flame" have been added as bonus tracks to the later reissues of the Dig CD.

References

1956 compilation albums
Miles Davis compilation albums
Prestige Records compilation albums
Albums produced by Bob Weinstock
Stan Getz albums
Lee Konitz albums